Yahudi Ki Ladki (The Jew's Daughter) is a historical Urdu play by Agha Hashar Kashmiri, on the theme of persecution of Jews by the Romans. It was first published in 1913. The play became his best known work, and a classic in Parsi-Urdu theatre.

The play was originally inspired by and adapted from W.T. Moncrieff's 19th century play, The Jewess, and uses a mixture of Urdu, Khari Boli and even Braj Bhasha at places.

Adaptations
The play was adapted several times in India, in the silent films, the early talkies era and later, attesting to its popularity. Notably the play was made into a film Yahudi Ki Ladki (1933) by New Theatres Ltd. Calcutta, directed by Premankur Atorthy and starring K. L. Saigal. It was made into a film again in 1956 by Nanubhai Vakil, in 1957 by S. D. Narang, and in 1958 it was adapted again by noted director, Bimal Roy, as Yahudi starring  Dilip Kumar, Meena Kumari and Sohrab Modi.

In 1981, theater director Nadira Babbar started her theater group Ekjute (Together) with the production of Yahudi Ki Ladki, which revived the Parsi theatre style.

References

Plays by Agha Hashar Kashmiri
1913 plays
Indian plays adapted into films
Works about antisemitism
Works set in the Roman Empire
Plays set in ancient Rome
Urdu-language plays